DPB may stand for:

Government 

Domestic Purposes Benefit, in the New Zealand social security system
Defense Policy Board of the U.S. Department of Defense
Dental Practice Board, a UK government agency now incorporated into the NHS Business Services Authority

Science and technology 

Decoded Picture Buffer, used by video decoders
USCG deployable pursuit boat, used by the U.S. Coast Guard
Diffuse panbronchiolitis, a lung disease
Disinfection by-product, in water treatment

Other uses 

Deer Park Bypass, a freeway in Melbourne, Australia
Deutscher Pfadfinderbund (1945)
Discounted Payback, an engineering economics measure
Dopravný podnik Bratislava, a public transport company in Slovakia